Prime Minister of the Maldives was a public office in the Sultanate of the Maldives and the Republic of the Maldives.

Prime ministers of the Maldives

Ibrahim Dorhimeyna Kilegefan served as Prime Minister on three occasions between 1883 and 1925. Abdul Majeed Didi served as Prime Minister from 1926 to 1932. Muhammad Fareed Didi served as Prime Minister from 1932 to 1944. Mohamed Amin Didi served as Prime Minister from 1945 to 1952.

After restoration of the Sultanate, Ibrahim Ali Didi served as Prime Minister from March 1954 to 1957 and Ibrahim Nasir served as Prime Minister from December 1957 to November 1968. 

During the Republic, there has been only one Prime Minister. Ahmed Zaki served as Prime Minister from August 1972 to March 1975. After Zaki was dismissed by Nasir, there has been no other Prime Minister in the Maldives and the post has been abolished.

References

 
Maldivian politicians
Maldives